Heloderma alvarezi, the Chiapan beaded lizard or black beaded lizard, is a species of lizard of the Helodermatidae family. It is found in Mexico and Guatemala.

References

Helodermatidae
Reptiles described in 1956
Reptiles of Mexico
Reptiles of Guatemala